Tiger on the Beat (老虎出更), also known as Tiger on Beat, is a 1988 Hong Kong action comedy film directed by Lau Kar-leung. The film stars Chow Yun-fat and Conan Lee as a buddy cop team who originally hate each other, but learn to overcome their differences in solving a case.

Synopsis
This action-comedy movie in the style of Lethal Weapon is about a lazy police veteran Francis Li (Chow Yun-fat) and his eager rookie partner Michael Tso (Conan Lee). The pair of mismatched partners are assigned to investigate the murder of a heroin trafficker "Poison Snake" Ping (Phillip Ko) who was known to be associated with crime boss Johnny Law (Norman Chui). The duo interrogate bar girl Marydonna (Nina Li Chi]) who is the sister of "Poison Snake" Ping, one of Law's associates. Marydonna eventually caves to the intense pressure and fingers Law. Though the criminal soon winds up in jail and Li gets his long overdue promotion, Law is all out for revenge.

Cast
 Chow Yun-fat as Francis Li
 Nina Li Chi as Marydonna (credited as Li Chi)
 Conan Lee as Michael Tso
 Gordon Liu as Fai, the Hitman
 Philip Ko as Heroin dealer (credited as Ko Fai)
 Shing Fui-On as Dummy (credited as Shing Fui Ann)
 Ti Lung as Loong
 David Chiang as Police Superintendent (credited as John Keung)
 James Wong as Police Inspector Jim Pak
 Lydia Shum as department store staff (credited as Sun Tin Ha)
 Lau Kar-wing as Sour Puss
 Shirley Ng as Mimi, Francis' sister
 Norman Chui as Mr. Law (credited as Tsui Shui Keung)
 Chan Chi Shing as Shing
 Joe Bryan Baker as Boss

Sequel
The film was followed by an sequel in 1990, Tiger on the Beat 2. The film starred Danny Lee, and Conan Lee reprised his role but Chow Yun-fat did not.

References

External links
 
 Tiger on the Beat at Hong Kong Cinemagic
 

1988 films
1980s action comedy films
1980s buddy comedy films
1980s buddy cop films
1980s police comedy films
1980s police procedural films
1980s Cantonese-language films
Films directed by Lau Kar-leung
Films set in Hong Kong
Gun fu films
Hong Kong action comedy films
Hong Kong buddy films
Police detective films
1980s Hong Kong films